Rawski (Polish feminine: Rawska; plural: Rawscy) is a surname. Notable people with this surname include:

 Evelyn Rawski (born 1939), American sinologist
 Krystyna Czajkowska-Rawska (born 1936), Polish volleyball player and coach

See also
 
 

Polish-language surnames